Fred Carter (born 1945) is an American basketball player and coach.

Fred Carter may also refer to:

Fred Carter (artist) (1938–2022), American artist
Fred Carter (athlete)
Fred Carter (convict) (1835–?), convict transported to Western Australia, later became a colony schoolteacher
Fred Carter Jr. (1933–2010), American musician
Frederic Carter (1853–1924), English cricketer
Frederick Carter (1819–1900), Canadian lawyer and politician in Newfoundland
Fred G. Carter (1888–?), American college football player and coach
Fred Carter (rugby league), English rugby league footballer of the 1910s and 1920s

See also
Charles Frederick Carter (1919–2002), British academic and Vice-Chancellor of Lancaster University
Carter (disambiguation)